Nian or Neyan or Niyan may refer to:
 Nian, Hormozgan
 Nian, Kermanshah
 Nian, Razavi Khorasan